Louis-Auguste Veillon (29 December 1834, in Bex – 5 January 1890, in Geneva) was a Swiss painter, noted for his Orientalist works.

Life and career

After obtaining a degree in Reformed theology in Lausanne, he joined François Diday at his studio in Geneva, where he primarily painted seascapes and mountain scenes from the Bernese Oberland. In 1858, he enrolled at the Ecole des Beaux-Arts in Paris. While in Paris, he spent a considerable amount of time in the Louvre, copying the works of the masters, especially the 17th-century Dutch masters and the work of Claude Lorrain. He later reported that this discipline led him to the luminism characteristic of his paintings.

In Paris, he made the acquaintance of the Orientalist artist, Eugène Fromentin who was his neighbour. This marked a turning point in Veillon's work and aroused his interest in Orientalist subject matter. He traveled to Rome, the Netherlands, Switzerland and Egypt, then lived in Venice for two years, before settling down in Geneva.

Veillon travelled to Egypt at least four times. In 1873, he stayed there with his friend, the artist, Etienne Duval (1824-1919), for a period of four months. In Egypt, he focussed on producing work with Orientalist themes, featuring landscapes showing the Nile or the Dead Sea. His works were very popular, especially in Switzerland.

Although he travelled extensively, Geneva remained at the centre of his life and work. He died there on 5 January 1890 at the age of 55 years.

Work
Veillon distanced himself from the Romantic school of his master, Diday, instead pursuing a more realistic approach. He used soft brush strokes and a slightly pastel colour palette.

'Select list of paintings

 Bedouins at Rest
 Bord du Lac à Rivaz (Lakeshore at Rivaz)
 Les Pêcheurs de la Région de Naples, (Fishermen of the Naples Region)
 La Punta della Dogana, Venise (Dogana Bridge, Venice)
 Dutch River Landscape with the town of Dordrecht in the background
 Tunis
 Calm Water 
 The Temple of Philae, Aswan

See also
 List of Orientalist artists
 Orientalism

References

Further reading
Rudolf Pestalozzi, Louis Auguste Veillon, 1891

1834 births
1890 deaths
19th-century Swiss painters
Swiss male painters
Orientalist painters
19th-century Swiss male artists